Séamus Harnedy (born 17 July 1990) is an Irish hurler who plays for East Cork Championship club St Ita's, divisional side Imokilly and at inter-county level with the Cork senior hurling team. He usually lines out as a centre-forward.

Playing career

University College Cork

During his tenure at University College Cork, Harnedy played a key role for the university's various hurling teams.

In 2010 he was at corner-forward when UCC faced fierce local rivals and three-in-a-row Cork Institute of Technology in the final of the All-Ireland Freshers Championship. UCC went on to secure a 3-8 to 1-7 victory, giving Harnedy a winners' medal.

Harnedy progressed onto the UCC senior team during the 2011-12 college year, and lined out in the final of the Fitzgibbon Cup. CIT provided the opposition, however, UCC claimed an extra-time win as they celebrated the centenary of the competition on home soil with a narrow 2-15 to 2-14 victory. It was Harnedy's first Fitzgibbon Cup medal.

In 2012-13 UCC reached the Fitzgibbon decider once again. Mary Immaculate College were the surprise opponents, however, tradition prevailed and UCC retained their title with a 2-17 to 2-12 victory. It was Harnedy's second Fitzgibbon Cup medal.

St Ita's

Harnedy joined the Killeagh-Ita's amalgamation at a young age and played in all grades at juvenile and underage levels before lining out for the St Ita's club at adult level.

On 8 September 2007, Harnedy lined out at left corner-forward when St Ita's drew with Castlemagner in the final of the Cork Junior B Championship. St Ita's won the subsequent replay by 0-12 to 0-07, with Harnedy claiming his first silverware with the club.

Imokilly

Harnedy's performances at club level lead to him being selected for the Imokilly divisional team for the 2010 Cork Championship. He made his first appearance for the team on 1 May and was described as "impressive" after scoring 1-04 from play in the 3-25 to 0-05 defeat of Seandún. Harnedy ended the championship as Imokilly's second-highest scorer with 2-13.

Harnedy was appointed captain of the Imokilly team for the 2017 Cork Championship. On 22 October, he captained the team from centre-forward when Imokilly faced Blackrock in the final. He scored 1-01 from play in the 3-13 to 0-18 victory. It was the division's first title since 1998.

Harnedy retained the captaincy for the 2018 Cork Championship. On 14 October, he top scored with 1-06 from play when Imokilly retained the title after a 4-19 to 1-18 defeat of Midleton in the final.

For the third successive year, Harnedy captained Imokilly to the county final on 20 October 2019. Lining out at centre-forward, he scored 1-02 from play and collected a third successive winners' medal after the 2-17 to 1-16 defeat of Glen Rovers.

Cork

Under-21

Harnedy was added to the Cork under-21 team in his final eligible year for the grade in 2011. His first involvement with the team came on 15 July when he was an unused substitute for Cork's 4-19 to 1-21 defeat of Tipperary in the Munster semi-final. Harnedy was again an unused substitute when Cork suffered a 4-20 to 1-27 defeat by Limerick in the final on 3 August.

Senior

Harnedy was added to the Cork senior team for the 2011 Waterford Crystal Cup. He made his first appearance for the team on 23 January when he lined out at full-forward against University College Cork. Harnedy was held scoreless and was substituted in the 45th minute, however, Cork went on to win the game by 3-17 to 1-22. He failed to secure a place on the Cork panel for the National League.

After a two-year absence, Harnedy returned to the Cork senior team during the 2013 Waterford Crystal Cup. He was retained on the panel after the pre-season competition and made his first National League appearance on 10 March in a 1-12 to 0-15 draw with Waterford. On 23 June, Harnedy made his Munster Championship debut and scored 0-03 from right wing-forward in a 0-23 to 0-15 defeat of Clare at the Gaelic Grounds. He lined out in his first Munster final on 14 July 2013. Harnedy scored 0-03 in the 0-24 to 0-15 defeat by Limerick. On 8 September, he lined out at right wing-forward against Clare in the All-Ireland final. He scored 0-02 for Cork in the 3-16 to 0-25 draw. Harnedy was again at right wing-forward for the replay on 28 September and scored 1-02 from play in the 5-16 to 3-16 defeat. He ended the season by being named at right wing-forward on the All-Star team.

On 3 July 2014, Harnedy won a Munster Championship medal after scoring 1-02 from play in Cork's 2-24 to 0-24 defeat of Limerick in the last final to be played at the old Páirc Uí Chaoimh. He was also named man of the match.

On 3 May 2015, Harnedy was selected at centre-forward for Cork's National League final-meeting with Waterford. He scored 0-02 before being substituted due to an injury in the 70th-minute in the 1-24 to 0-17 defeat. Harnedy missed the opening game of the Munster Championship because of the hamstring injury.

Harnedy lined out in his second Munster final on 9 July 2017. Playing at left corner-forward, he scored 0-02 from play in the 1-25 to 1-20 defeat of Clare. 

Harnedy was appointed captain of the Cork senior hurling team for the 2018 season. On 1 July, he won a third Munster Championship medal after scoring 1-04 from play in Cork's 2-24 to 3-19 defeat of Clare in the final. Harnedy was later named in the left wing-forward position on the All-Star team.

Harnedy retained the Cork captaincy for the 2019 season.

Career statistics

Division

Inter-county

Honours

Pobalscoil na Tríonóide
Cork Colleges Under-16 B Hurling Championship (1): 2007

University College Cork
Fitzgibbon Cup (2): 2012, 2013
All-Ireland Freshers' Hurling Championship (1): 2010

St Ita's
East Cork Junior A Hurling Championship (1): 2021
Cork Junior B Hurling Championship (1): 2007

Imokilly
Cork Senior Hurling Championship (3): 2017 (c), 2018 (c), 2019 (c)

Cork
Munster Senior Hurling Championship (3): 2014, 2017, 2018 (c)

Awards
GAA GPA All Stars Awards (2): 2013, 2018
The Sunday Game Team of the Year (1): 2018

References

External link
Séamus Harnedy profile at the Cork GAA website

1990 births
Living people
Cork inter-county hurlers
Glenbower Rovers Gaelic footballers
Irish schoolteachers
People from Youghal
St Ita's hurlers
UCC hurlers